= Markopoulo Olympic Complex =

Sports complex in Athens, Greece

Coordinates: 37.983826°N 23.780349°E

Markopoulo Olympic Complex is a sports complex in Athens, Greece. It held two of the sports venues used during the 2004 Summer Olympics.
